Beauty and the Beast is a 1976 TV movie directed by Fielder Cook, written by Sherman Yellen and produced by Hallmark Hall of Fame Productions and Palm Films. The movie is a live-action adaptation of Jeanne-Marie Leprince de Beaumont's eighteenth-century fairy tale starring real-life husband and wife George C. Scott and Trish Van Devere.

Cast 

 George C. Scott as the Beast
 Trish Van Devere as Belle
 Virginia McKenna as Lucy
 Bernard Lee as Beaumont
 Michael Harbour as Anthony
 William Relton as Nicholas
 Patricia Quinn as Susan

Reception

Accolades

References

External links 
 

Films based on Beauty and the Beast
Films directed by Fielder Cook